Poznań University of Technology, PUT (Polish name: Politechnika Poznańska) is a university in Poznań, Poland. Poznań University of Technology is known as one of the best technical universities in Poland. URAP ranked PUT as in top 6% of world universities and Webometrics ranked it at no. 842 in the world by Google citations for the year 2015. In 1995 it became the first Polish university to become a member of the Conference of European Schools for Advanced Engineering Education and Research (CESAER), an organization comprising the best technical universities in Europe. The university is also a member of the Socrates-Erasmus programme for exchange students from all over Europe, promoting advanced engineering and a European dimension. The university is home to many organizations and student circles, and the radio station Afera 98.6 MHz. The university has over 21,000 students and over 1100 academic staffs.

Faculties
There are ten faculties:
Architecture
Chemical Technology
Civil and Environmental Engineering
Computing
Electrical Engineering
Electronics and Telecommunications
Engineering Management
Machines and Transportation
Mechanical Engineering and Management 
Technical Physics

History
PUT was officially founded in 1955 and the first rector was Roman Kozak. But a state school had existed in Poznań since 1919, under name of the Higher State School of Machinery. After adding a second department in 1929, its name was changed to the Higher State School of Machinery and Electrotechnics. It was supposed to become the University of Technology in 1940, but its development was interrupted by World War II. In 1945 the school received the status of Higher Engineering School and in 1955 it became the University of Technology.

In 1999 Poznan University of Technology (PUT) celebrated 80 anniversary of the higher educational technical system in Poznan. It continues traditions of the State Higher School of Mechanical Engineering, which was opened in August 1919. The school remained open at the outbreak of the Second World War, during which time 716 graduates had completed their studies there. It was allocated in a building nowadays situated at Marie Skłodowska-Curie Square, today the Rector's Office. In 1929, the school changed its name to the State Higher School of Mechanical and Electrical Engineering. As a result of further development, the Higher School was to be given the status of a university in 1940. Unfortunately, this did not occur during the war period. In September 1945, the school received the title High School of Engineering and after ten years became Poznan University of Technology.

PUT is at present autonomous state institution consisting of nine faculties in which institutes and chairs over one thousand academic staff members do research and run educational tasks for over fourteen thousand students of full -time and part-time studies. PUT has been granted the right to confer doctorates in technical science. Moreover, it runs postgraduate studies within different faculties.

In 1995 PUT, as the first Polish University of Technology, became a member of the Conference of European Schools for Advanced Engineering Education and Research – CESAER-bringing together the best European Engineering Colleges and Universities of Technology. In 1999 PUT was the host organization of the IX CESAER Conference.

In the academic year 1999 / 2000 European Credit Transfer System –ECTS-was introduced at the PUT.

Successes

Students from the Faculty of Computer Science started few times in CSIDC computer systems projecting world championships organised by Institute of Electrical and Electronics Engineers (IEEE) Computer Society and ImagineCup (Microsoft). Four different teams in 2001–2006 managed by Doctor of Engineering Jan Kniat were three-time world champions. Many graduates from Computer science and Management faculty work in Microsoft corporation in Redmond, Washington, US. PUT is a member of CESAER Association and was the first Polish technical university to receive membership of that organisation.

Notable alumni

Paweł Arndt (b. 1954), politician
Jacek Błażewicz (b. 1951), computer scientist
Janusz Centka (b. 1950), glider pilot, winner of three World Gliding Championships
Witold Czarnecki (b. 1953), politician 
Aleksander Doba (b. 1946), explorer, traveller
Waldy Dzikowski (b. 1959), politician
Andrzej Jajszczyk (b. 1952), scientist, academic
Roman Słowiński (b. 1952), computer scientist, academic
Jan Węglarz (b. 1947), computer scientist

List of rectors

Roman Kozak (1955–1962) 
Zbigniew Jasicki (1962–1969)  
Wiktor Jankowski (1969–1972)  
Bolesław Wojciechowicz (1972–1981) 
Edmund Tuliszka (1981–1982)  
Czesław Królikowski (1982–1983)  
Wiktor Jankowski (1983–1984)  
Tadeusz Puchałka (1984–1985)  
Andrzej Ryżyński (1985–1990)  
Jarosław Stefaniak (1990–1993)  
Eugeniusz Mitkowski (1993–1999)  
Jerzy Dembczyński (1999–2005)  
Adam Hamrol (2005–2012)  
Tomasz Łodygowski (2012–2020)

See also
List of universities in Poland
Universities in Poznan

References

External links
Official site of PUT
PUT's Institute of Computer Science
PUT's Institute of Management Engineering
PUT's Institute of Environmental Engineering
Association of Scientific Circles at PUT
Scientific Circle of Environmental Engineers

Poznań University of Technology
Educational institutions established in 1955
1955 establishments in Poland